Strasburg Historic District is a national historic district located at Strasburg, Lancaster County, Pennsylvania. The district includes 206 contributing buildings and 1 contributing site in the central business district and surrounding residential areas of Strasburg.

The district includes notable examples of German vernacular, Georgian and Federal architectural styles.  They are built of log, brick, limestone, and sandstone.  Some date to before 1815.

The building at 33 East Main Street, now known as the Limestone Inn, was built in 1786. It was the home Strasburg's first Chief Burgess (mayor) and served as the first post office beginning in 1805. Up to 50 students from the Strasburg Academy boarded in the house from 1839 to 1860.

The historic district was listed on the National Register of Historic Places in 1983.

References

Historic districts on the National Register of Historic Places in Pennsylvania
Federal architecture in Pennsylvania
Georgian architecture in Pennsylvania
Historic districts in Lancaster County, Pennsylvania
National Register of Historic Places in Lancaster County, Pennsylvania